Probable E3 ubiquitin-protein ligase MYCBP2 also known as myc-binding protein 2 or protein associates with myc (PAM) is an enzyme that in humans is encoded by the MYCBP2 gene.

Structure 

PAM contains a N-terminal leucine zipper, central MYC-binding, and C-terminal histone-binding protein homology domains.

Interactions 

MYCBP2 has been shown to interact with Myc.

References

Further reading